The  is a railway tunnel on the Jōetsu Shinkansen on the border of Gunma Prefecture and Niigata Prefecture, Japan.

In 1978, the Dai-Shimizu tunnel was completed. This tunnel was dug for the Jōetsu Shinkansen that was to be completed in 1982. This tunnel was the world's longest railway tunnel at  until the Seikan Tunnel was built. During the construction, a fire created a large amount of smoke in the tunnel, and 16 workers died from carbon monoxide poisoning. When this tunnel was completed, the travel time between Niigata and Tokyo went down to approximately one hour and forty minutes, three hours faster than using the Jōetsu Line.

Also, when this tunnel was built, natural water was found during construction, which is now sold in bottles.

References

Railway tunnels in Japan
Tunnels completed in 1982
1982 establishments in Japan